Ben Shockley (born 3 February 1965) is an English actor.

Early life
Shockley (born David White) grew up in Hythe, Kent, the son of Alan Richard White (deceased) and Elsie Alice White.

Career
Shockley has appeared in films such as On the Ropes, Ten Dead Men and Bad Day.

In 2011, Shockley was interviewed for the book The Good Bad Guys.

Ink Pixel Films released a video in July 2012 featuring Shockley and British director Mark Noyce. During the discussion it was revealed that filming had begun on the comedy This is Jade (AKA The One Hit Wonder). It was also revealed that the two were collaborating on The Blazing Cannon's.

Filmography

Film

Television

References

External links
 
 
 Britfilms
 Fandango website
 On the ropes movie website

1965 births
English male film actors
Living people
English male television actors